Journal d'Hirondelle is a novel by Belgian writer Amélie Nothomb. It was first published in 2006.

References 

2006 Belgian novels
French-language novels
Novels by Amélie Nothomb
Éditions Albin Michel books